That Navy Spirit is a 1937 American sports film directed by Kurt Neumann and starring Lew Ayres, Mary Carlisle and John Howard. It is also known by the alternative title Hold 'Em Navy. It follows two members of the American football team at the United States Naval Academy in Annapolis who compete over the same girl before the varsity game against West Point.

Plot
As first-year "plebes" at the Naval Academy, newcomers Tommy and Stuffy are subjected to rude treatment by the upperclassmen. After one of them, Chuck Baldwin, gives him a hard time, Tommy decides to invite Chuck's sweetheart Judy to a school ball.

Tommy is also a talented football quarterback, but because Chuck informs on him being out after curfew, Tommy is suspended from the team and Navy loses the game. Judy is upset with Tommy, but a year later, when the situation is reversed and Chuck is caught out after dark, Tommy vouches for him. Chuck plays and helps Navy defeat Army in the big game, then dedicates the victory to Tommy.

Main cast
 Lew Ayres as Tommy Graham 
 Mary Carlisle as Judy Holland 
 John Howard as Chuck Baldwin 
 Elizabeth Patterson as Grandma Holland 
 Benny Baker as Stuffy Miller 
 Archie Twitchell as Jerry Abbott 
 Tully Marshall as The 'Admiral' 
 Billy Daniel as Midshipman Steve Crenshaw 
 Richard Denning as Midshipman Jepson 
 John Hubbard as Midshipman Hopkins 
 Lee Bennett as Midshipman Blake

Alan Ladd has a small role.

References

Bibliography
 Quinlan, David. The Film Lover's Companion: An A to Z Guide to 2,000 Stars and the Movies They Made. Carol Publishing Group, 1997.

External links
 

1937 films
1930s sports films
Films directed by Kurt Neumann
Paramount Pictures films
American football films
Films set in Maryland
American black-and-white films
1930s English-language films
1930s American films